is a Japanese semi-professional football club based in Shinjuku, Tokyo. They currently play in the Japan Football League, Japanese 4th-tier of football league, since 2021.

History 
The club was founded by the current chairman Kazutomo Maruyama as a leisure club under the name Criacao in 2005 to create an opportunity to play football even after completing his studies at Rikkyō University. After Maruyama's professional return to Tokyo, he first registered for the Japan Football Association in 2009.

Club name
Criacao is from the Portuguese criação and means translated as much as "creation", "creation", "production". In doing so, the club alludes to the club's philosophy, which states it aims to achieve "continuous generation of enthusiasm in the world through football".

Road to the JFL 

From 2010 to 2018, the club only played in the Tokyo Leagues, not going further than it until the club saw promotion on 2018, after finishing as runners-up in Tokyo's 1st division. After nine seasons the club finally got to debut at regional level, in the 2nd division of the Kantō Soccer League.

Immediately after being promoted to it, the club earned the division's title after winning 43 out of 51 possible points, and then, were promoted to the 1st division. Debuting on it in 2020, the club only earned a 5th-place finish. 

In 2021, Criacao Shinjuku secured promotion for the Japan Football League (JFL), the 4th tier of Japanese football, via the Japanese Regional Football Champions League, which is JFL's promotion/relegation series.

JFL (2022–) 

In 2022, Criacao Shinjuku finished in the 15th place of the competition, out of the 16 participating teams for the season. The club, however, was not relegated back to the Kantō League, as JFL's top 2 teams were promoted to the J3. Under the league system, Criacao would only be relegated as the 15th-placed team if no team earned promotion to the J3 during the season, which was not the case. The club also currently holds the Japan Football League attendance record, made on 9 October 2022. A crowd of 16,218 people watched the match between Suzuka Point Getters and Criacao Shinjuku at the Japan National Stadium, in Shinjuku, being the record heavily influenced by the presence of Japan former international Kazuyoshi Miura. The match ended in a 1–0 loss for Criacao. 

The club currently second consecutive season in JFL on 2023.

League & cup record 

Key

Honours
 Tokyo Metropolitan Government Division 2 - Winners 2011
 Tokyo Metropolitan Government Division 1 - Winners 2013
 Tokyo Division 1 Winners - 2014
 Kanto Division 2 Winners - 2019
 Kanto Division 1 Winners - 2021
 Japan Regional Football Champions League Winners - 2021

Current squad

Club Staff 
As of the 2023 season

Managerial history

See also 
 Japan Football Association (JFA)

References

External links 
 Official website
 Criacao Corporation

2005 establishments in Japan
Association football clubs established in 2005
Football clubs in Japan
Football clubs in Tokyo
Japan Football League clubs
Shinjuku
Works association football clubs in Japan